At the 2006 Commonwealth Games, the athletics events were held in Melbourne, Australia from 19 March to 25 March 2006. A total of 47 events were contested, of which 24 by male and 23 by female athletes. Furthermore, three men's and three women's disability events were held within the programme. All athletics events took place within the Melbourne Cricket Ground, while the marathon and racewalking events took place on the streets of Melbourne and finished at the main stadium.

The hosts Australia easily won the medals table with 16 golds and 41 medals in total. Jamaica came second with 10 golds and 22 medals, while Kenya and England were the next best performers. A total of eleven Games records were broken over the course of the seven-day competition. Six of the records were broken by Australian athletes.

Medal summary

Men

Men's disability events

Women

Women's disability events

Medal table

Participating nations

References
General
Brown, Matthew (2006-03-19). Marathons kick-off athletics in front of 76,000 crowd - Commonwealth Games, Day One. IAAF. Retrieved on 2010-03-04.
Brown, Matthew (2006-03-20). 79,000 witness Powell saunter to 100m gold - Commonwealth Games, Day Two. IAAF. Retrieved on 2010-03-04.
Brown, Matthew (2006-03-21). Macey defeats injury, and Williams-Darling is beaten - Commonwealth Games, Day Three. IAAF. Retrieved on 2010-03-04.
Brown, Matthew (2006-03-22). Wishing to emulate Freeman – Commonwealth Games, Day Four. IAAF. Retrieved on 2010-03-04.
Brown, Matthew (2006-03-23). 83,000 spectators applaud Pittman's gold - Commonwealth Games, Day Five. IAAF. Retrieved on 2010-03-04.
Brown, Matthew (2006-03-24). Mutola Defeated, Aussies inspired - Commonwealth Games, Day Six . IAAF. Retrieved on 2010-03-04.
Brown, Matthew (2006-03-25). Jamaican sprint dominance continues as Games conclude - Commonwealth Games Day 7. IAAF. Retrieved on 2010-03-04.
Specific

External links
Official 2006 Commonwealth Games athletics page

 
Athletics
2006
Commonwealth Games
International athletics competitions hosted by Australia